Restless is the first full-length album by American actor and musician Kasey Lansdale. It was recorded in 2013 and the executive producer is John Carter Cash. It was released on the indie label Blue Siren Records and was recorded at Cash Cabin Studios near Nashville, Tennessee.  To support the record, she has been touring both in the U.S. and Europe.

Track listing

Sorry Ain't Enough
Foolin' Around
Better Now
Blame You for Trying
Why Can't I
Never Say Never
Don't Let That Stop You
Hard to be a Lady
Just Another Guy
Somewhere Else
Half as Much

References

External links
Artist's official website

2013 albums
Kasey Lansdale albums